Slaughter Daughter is the second EP by the Canadian rock band Die Mannequin, released on September 25, 2007. "Do It or Die" and "Saved By Strangers" were produced by Ian D'Sa of Billy Talent and "Upside Down Cross" and "Lonely of a Woman" were produced by Junior Sanchez. "Open Season" is a live bootleg recording.

Track listing
All songs written by Care Failure, except "Upside Down Cross" by Care Failure and Michael T. Fox.

"Do It or Die" – 3:36
"Saved By Strangers" – 3:24
"Upside Down Cross" – 3:55
"Lonely of a Woman" – 3:40
"Open Season - Raw Bootleg" – 5:57

Personnel
Die Mannequin
Care Failure – lead vocals, guitar
Anthony "Useless" Bleed – bass
Pat M. – drums, percussion

Technical staff and artwork
Tracks 1&2 Produced by Ian D'Sa
Tracks 3&4 Produced by Junior Sanchez.
Tracks 1&2 Recorded by Eric Ratz & Kenny Luong
Tracks 3&4 Recorded by Ray Martin assisted by Jeff Pelletier
All tracks mixed by Eric Ratz
Mastered by Noah Mintz
Art by Care Failure / Marc P.

See also
Die Mannequin

External links
Official website
Myspace

2007 EPs